Stuart Taylor may refer to:

Stuart Taylor (cricketer) (1900–1978), Australian cricketer
Stuart Taylor (footballer, born 1947) (1947–2019), English former footballer for Bristol Rovers
Stuart Taylor (footballer, born 1974), Scottish footballer and coach 
Stuart Taylor (footballer, born 1980), English football goalkeeper
Stuart Taylor Jr., American journalist and author
Stuart Ross Taylor (1925–2021), New Zealand-born geochemist and planetary scientist